Rino Lupo (1888–1934) was an Italian-Portuguese film director. He made films in several countries during the silent era. He was forced to flee from Russia following the Russian Revolution in 1917.

Selected filmography
 José do Telhado (1929)

References

Bibliography
 Vieira, Patricia. Portuguese Film, 1930-1960,: The Staging of the New State Regime. A&C Black, 2013.

External links

1888 births
1934 deaths
Film directors from Rome
People who emigrated to escape Bolshevism